Tropical Storm Gladys in August 1991 was a large tropical cyclone that affected Japan and South Korea. An area of disturbed weather first formed within the Western Pacific monsoon trough on August 15. Slowly organizing, the disturbance developed into a tropical depression on August 15. Heading northwest, Gladys became a tropical storm the following day. Despite forecasts of significant strengthening, its large size only enabled slow intensification. After turning west, Gladys attained peak intensity on August 21 near Okinawa. After turning north and bypassing Kyushu, Gladys began to encounter significant wind shear, which caused weakening. Gladys veered west, interacting with land. Gladys weakened to a tropical depression on August 24, and dissipated the next day.

Affecting the Philippines weeks after a volcanic eruption, the storm forced 67,000 people to evacuate but there were no deaths. Across southern Japan, the storm dropped heavy rains, with rainfall totals in some areas exceeding . Overall, 23 fatalities were reported and 11 others sustained injuries. Nearly 200,000 train passengers were stranded. A total 53 houses were destroyed while 4,162 others were flooded. According to the National Police Agency, torrential rains caused 92 landslides, damaged 48 roads, and washed away four bridges. Four ships as well as 4,142 ha (10,235 acres) of farmland were damaged. Monetary damage totaled ¥11.9 billion ($88.4 million USD). The storm's unusually large wind field resulted in extremely heavy precipitation across South Korea, where at least 90 people were killed while 62 others were injured. About 6,700 houses were flooded and over 1,500 houses were damaged, which resulted in 40,000 homeless. Over 100 ha (245 acres) of farmland were inundated. Damage there was estimated at $164 million USD.

Meteorological history

The origins of Gladys can be traced back to an active Western Pacific monsoon trough during mid-August 1991. An area of disturbed weather developed within the trough late on August 13. A weak low-pressure area then developed and over the next two days, the disturbance slowly organized while tracking northwestward. The JMA upgraded the disturbance into a tropical depression at 00:00 UTC on August 15 while the JTWC issued a Tropical Cyclone Formation Alert (TCFA) at 07:30 UTC. An increase in curved banding features prompted the JTWC to declare the system Tropical Depression 14W at 00:00 UTC on August 16. At the same time, the JMA upgraded the depression into a tropical storm, with the JTWC following suit that evening.

On August 17, the JMA upgraded Gladys into a severe tropical storm. Continuing to slowly intensify, Gladys turned west, contrast to forecasts of recurvature, and tracked through the Ryukyu Islands. The same day, the storm turned north, passing west of Kyushu before turning northwest east of the Korean Peninsula under the influence of a ridge over the Sea of Japan. A passing trough to its north enhanced southerly wind shear, and that along with land interaction triggered rapid weakening. The JTWC discontinued warnings at noon on August 23, with the JMA classifying Gladys as a tropical depression the next day. The JMA ceased tracking the storm altogether on August 25.

Impact

Philippines
Monsoon rains caused by Gladys prompted maximum weather alerts for nine major river valleys in the provinces of Tarlac, Pampanga, and Zambales, all previously affected by a volcanic eruption weeks earlier. In the later, 15,000 people were evacuated from six villages while 52,000 others were evacuated from nine cities in Pampanga. Many areas, including Manila, sustained flooding, but no fatalities were reported.

Japan
Due to Gladys' large wind field, the storm dropped heavy rainfall across much of the Japanese archipelago for several days. A peak rainfall total of  occurred at Hidegadake. Meanwhile, a peak daily precipitation total of  fell in Koinya.

While passing south of Okinawa, the outer fringes of the storm dropped moderate to heavy rainfall across Tokushima Prefecture. Roads were cut in 15 places and damage there amounted to ¥160 million. On the southern tip of Kyushu Island, two people suffered injuries in Kagoshima Prefecture. A total of 168 homes were damaged and 12 others were destroyed. Twenty-nine homes were damaged and four were demolished, resulting in six people homeless. Throughout Kanagawa Prefecture, sixty-two homes were damaged and three more were destroyed. A total of 35,000 households were left without power. In Hakone, one person died after he fell from his automobile. There, 24 roads necessitated closure. Across Hakone and Odawara, 13 mudslides were reported. Throughout Tokyo, one person was wounded. A total of nineteen homes were damaged and five were destroyed. Roads were flooded in 37 districts across the city. Five people died and three were reported missing in Okutama after a mudslide buried two wooden houses and a hotel. A fire killed three people, left another missing, and injured two others in Izu. Six ferries were delayed offshore Chiba Prefecture. Seven people were killed in Otsuki, two in traffic accidents and five motorists died when a landslide swept their vehicles off a highway. In Ibaraki Prefecture, eighteen homes were damaged and one was destroyed. Further north, in Saitama Prefecture, 1,495 homes were damaged and 224 others were destroyed, resulting in 668 homeless. One person was also injured. Damage in Gunma prefecture amounted to ¥3.8 billion, where 97 roads were destroyed and 38 rivers flooded. Thirty-nine landslides occurred in Tochigi Prefecture. A total of 658 homes were damaged and 76 others were destroyed. Embankments were damaged in 45 locations. Damage there was estimated at ¥14.3 billion. Fifty homes sustained damage in Fukushima Prefecture.

Nationwide, 23 fatalities were reported and 11 others sustained injuries. Nearly 200,000 train passengers were stranded. A total 53 houses were destroyed while 4,162 others were flooded. According to the National Police Agency, torrential rains caused 92 landslides, cut 48 roads and washed away four bridges. Monetary damage totaled ¥11.9 billion, equal to $88.4 million USD.

South Korea
In advance of the storm, 22,000 tourists were evacuated from low-lying areas while 44,000 ships were pulled into shelter. Typhoon warnings were issued for the Cheju area. According to authorities, the primary threat of the cyclone was expected to be heavy rainfall. Tropical Storm Gladys' broad circulation caused torrential rainfall in South Korea; Pusan, South Korea's second largest city, received 610 mm (24 in) of rain in 20 hours, setting a single-day rainfall record. Furthermore, sections along the southeast coast were reported to have received 660 mm (26 in) during the same period. During a 24-hour period in Ulsan,  of rain fell, the most ever recorded on record. During a two day period, Kyongju received , the heaviest recorded during a storm there since record keeping began in 1904.

In Punsan, eight people were confirmed killed and one was rendered missing, with a man dying after he was struck by a falling steel ladder while the remainder drowned in waist-high floodwaters. The primary highway connecting Seoul to Pusan was blocked by a landslide. Just north off Pulsan, the storm's high winds forced a  nuclear reactor to shut down. More than 500 individuals lost their homes. A man was electrocuted in the city when he stepped on a high-voltage power line knocked down by the storm. Further west, five people were killed when their homes were buried in landslides in Changwon. Two people drowned in overflowed rivers in nearby Masan. Throughout South Korea, at least 90 people were killed and 62 others were injured. Telephone lines were cut and rail traffic was disrupted. All domestic flights were cancelled but international flights were not. About 6,700 houses were flooded and over 1,500 houses were damaged, resulting in 40,000 homeless. Over  of farmland were inundated. Damage was estimated at $146 million USD, with property damage exceeding $44 million.

See also

Tropical Storm Winona (1990)

Notes

References

1991 Pacific typhoon season
Typhoons in Japan
1991 in Japan
Typhoons in the Philippines
1991 in the Philippines
Typhoons in South Korea
1991 in South Korea
Western Pacific severe tropical storms